Culcheth Laboratories was a British metallurgical and nuclear research institute that researched the structural design of nuclear reactors and reactor pressure vessels in Culcheth, Cheshire, then in south Lancashire and now in the borough of Warrington.

History
The Reactor Materials Laboratory was established at Culcheth in 1950. The UKAEA's Safety and Reliability Directorate (SRD) stayed at Culcheth until 1995.

Function
It carried out work on reactors for the British civil and military (submarine fleet) nuclear energy programmes, investigating metallurgy. In the first ten years, it carried out research on materials for fast breeder reactors; it was the first time that niobium had been part of a fast breeder reactor. The site investigated fracture mechanics, nuclear reactor physics and hydraulics.

Work on irradiation of metals was also carried out with the School of Materials, University of Manchester and the Department of Materials Science and Metallurgy, University of Cambridge.

Structure
Culcheth is just over one mile north of junction 11 of the M62 motorway on the A574.

It was administrated by the Research and Development Branch of the United Kingdom Atomic Energy Authority (UKAEA).

See also
 List of nuclear reactors

References

External links
 Local history

1950 establishments in England
1995 disestablishments in England
Chemical research institutes
Former nuclear research institutes
History of Warrington
Materials science institutes
Metallurgical industry of the United Kingdom
Metallurgical organizations
Nuclear research institutes in the United Kingdom
Research institutes established in 1950
Research institutes in Cheshire